Geroskipou FC is a Cypriot association football club based in Geroskipou. It has 1 participations in STOK Elite Division (2016-17 STOK Elite Division). It was founded in 2013 as Koloni Geroskipou FC. The name changed in 2017.

References

Koloni Geroskipou team profile on Cyprus Football Association.

Football clubs in Cyprus